Events from the year 1859 in Canada.

Incumbents
Monarch — Victoria

Federal government
Parliament — 6th

Governors
Governor General of the Province of Canada — Edmund Walker Head
Colonial Governor of Newfoundland — Alexander Bannerman
Governor of New Brunswick — Arthur Charles Hamilton-Gordon
Governor of Nova Scotia — George Phipps, 2nd Marquess of Normanby
Governor of Prince Edward Island — Dominick Daly

Premiers
Joint Premiers of the Province of Canada —
George-Étienne Cartier, Canada West Premier
Antoine-Aimé Dorion, Canada East Premier 
Premier of Newfoundland — John Kent
Premier of New Brunswick — Samuel Leonard Tilley
Premier of Nova Scotia — James William Johnston
Premier of Prince Edward Island — Edward Palmer

Events
Abraham Shadd is elected to the town council in Raleigh, Ontario and becomes the first Black elected to public office.
William Hall, becomes the first Nova Scotian and the first Black person to win the Victoria Cross.
The all-Black Victoria Pioneer Rifle Company is formed to defend British Columbia.
De Stoeckl returns to U.S. from Saint Petersburg with authority to negotiate the sale of Alaska.
McGowan's War, a juridical and political crisis in the Fraser River goldfields involving a spillover of San Francisco politics into British territory, has the potential to escalate into an annexationist uprising but is settled peaceably.  Marines and Royal Engineers are dispatched to Yale, led by Colonel Clement Francis Moody and escorting Justice Matthew Baillie Begbie to resolve the matter, which ends amicably, and reassert British sovereignty over the fledgling Mainland Colony.
Lyman Cutlar, an American settler, homesteads on San Juan Island in defiance of British claims and triggers off the Pig War.

Full date unknown
Black Rock, Montreal completed
1859 Newfoundland general election

Births

January to June
January 6 – Henry Pellatt, financier and soldier (died 1939)
January 17 – Joseph Ovide Brouillard, politician and businessman (died 1940)
January 18 – Elizabeth Shortt, politician
February 21 – William Proudfoot, politician and barrister (died 1922)
April 5 – Robert Franklin Sutherland, politician and Speaker of the House of Commons of Canada (died 1922)
May 8 – Edward Morris, 1st Baron Morris, politician and 2nd Prime Minister of Newfoundland (died 1935)
June 25 – George Henry Bradbury, politician (died 1925)

July to December
July 12 – Peter Vasilevich Verigin, philosopher, activist and leader and preacher of the Doukhobors (died 1924)
July 20 – Lionel Herbert Clarke, businessman and Lieutenant Governor of Ontario (died 1921)
August 4 – Louis-Adolphe Paquet, theologian (died 1942)
August 10 – Wellington Willoughby, politician and lawyer (died 1932)
September 17 – Frank Dawson Adams, geologist (died 1942)
November 8 – Paul-Eugène Roy, Roman Catholic priest, and Archbishop of Quebec (died 1926)

Deaths
February 22 – Edmond Baird, cabinet-maker and upholsterer (born 1802)
March 2 – Hugh Cossart Baker, Sr., banker, businessman and mathematician (born 1818)
March 23 – Jacob De Witt, businessman, politician, and justice of the peace (born 1785)
December 30 – Bernard Donald Macdonald, Roman Catholic priest, bishop, and school administrator (born 1797)

References 

 
Canada
Years of the 19th century in Canada
1859 in North America